Venezuela competed at the 2019 World Aquatics Championships in Gwangju, South Korea from 12 to 28 July.

Diving

Venezuela entered three divers.

Men

Women

Mixed

Open water swimming

Venezuela qualified two male and two female open water swimmers.

Men

Women

Mixed

Swimming

Venezuela has entered three swimmers.

Men

Women

References

World Aquatics Championships
Nations at the 2019 World Aquatics Championships
2019